Rabindra Sarobar (formerly known as Dhakuria Lake) is an artificial lake in South Kolkata in the Indian state of West Bengal. The name also refers to the area surrounding the lake. It is flanked by Southern Avenue to the North, Shyamaprasad Mukherjee Road to the West, Dhakuria to the East and the Kolkata Suburban Railway tracks to the south.

History

 

Their intention was to develop the area for residential use – improving the roads, raising and levelling  some of the adjacent land and building lakes and parks. Excavation work was undertaken with the  plan of creating a huge lake. The excavation of the lake was led by CIT's first chairman Cecil Henry Bompass, Kolkata Municipal Corporation's chief-engineer M.R. Atkins and a young Bengali passout from Shibpur B.E. College Prabodh Chandra Chatterjee and initially it was known as Bompass Lake. Originally known as Dhakuria Lake, in May 1958, CIT renamed the  lake as Rabindra Sarovar, as a tribute to Bengali writer and Nobel Laureate, Rabindranath Tagore.
The area around this excavated lake was later developed to build recreational complexes, which included children's parks, gardens and auditoria.
Today the lake and its surrounding areas are one of the most popular recreational areas in Kolkata.   are covered by water, while shrubs and  trees, some of which are more than 100 years old, occupy the rest of the area. A partial tree census in 2012 recorded 50 different species. In the winter, one can spot some migratory birds around the lake, though the numbers are dwindling because of the rise in pollution level. The lake itself is home to many varieties of fish. Fishing is strictly prohibited. In 2012 an abandoned waterhouse in the premises of lake turned into a museum run by Kolkata Improvement Trust as a gallery for installation art. Locals often called as “thakur-der gallery” is a place for some of the award-winning Durga idols of Kolkata.
A number of people come for a walk around the lake in the mornings to enjoy the fresh air. Many visit the sunrise point to offer their prayers to the sun. During the day, it is visited by families on a picnic, tourists, young lovers and joggers.

Landmarks
To the north is a football stadium, known as the Rabindra Sarobar Stadium, with a seating capacity of approximately 26,000 people. It was established in the 1950s and is today, the city's first stadium to be fully equipped with audio-visual training  facilities.
Also to the north is the open-air theatre, Mukta Mancha.
Nazrul Mancha is situated on the northern flank near Golpark.
The only Japanese Buddhist temple in Kolkata is located on the southern fringe of the Rabindra Sarovar. It was established in 1935 by Nichidatsu Fujii, founder of the worldwide Buddhist association, the Nipponzan Myohoji. Monks offer prayers in Japanese, to the sound of beating drums, in the early morning hours and at dusk. There are no restrictions on entry to the main temple even when prayers are in progress. Outside the main temple building there is a pillar, with a message of peace engraved in Japanese, and a pair of lions that symbolise the guardians of the faith. The Japanese refer to these figures as Komainu (lion-dog).
There is a mosque on one of the lake's islands, which predates the excavation of the lake itself. This island is connected to the southern shore by a cable-stayed wooden (now iron) suspension bridge, which was built in 1926 and renovated in 1962. The fish sanctuary under this bridge is an additional attraction.
There are some cannons lying on the lake's west bank that were found during the excavation in the early 1920s and retained by the CIT for beautification. It is believed that they were used by Nawab Siraj-ud-daulah, the last independent ruler of Bengal.
The complex contains a safari garden and children's play center with a lily pool, and a swimming pool. A toy train, operational between 1985 and 1989, was a popular draw for children.
A number of  rowing and swimming clubs are situated within the Rabindra Sarovar complex. While the former are located to the north of this lake, the latter are located to its south. In 1858 the British founded the Calcutta Rowing Club (CRC), presently one of the oldest clubs in India, to promote rowing activities in Kolkata.  In 1901, it got affiliated to the prestigious Amateur Rowing Association of the East (ARAE) and in 1923 signed a reciprocal arrangement deal with the London Rowing Club. The CRC has been the hub of competitive rowing in Kolkata for more than 150 years and has organised many intra- and inter-club competitions. Rowing facilities are available to members on a regular basis, from 6 am to 7:30 am and from 3:30 pm to 5 pm. The Bengal Rowing Club, Lake Club and Calcutta University Rowing Club are a few other rowing clubs located in the Rabindra Sarovar complex. One of the oldest swimming clubs in Kolkata, the Indian Life Saving Society (formerly known as Anderson Club) has its office in the lake complex.
The lake is within walking distance of the Ramakrishna Mission Institute of Culture at Golpark.
There is an auditorium or a hall within the sarovar complex which adjoins the Rabindra Sarovar Stadium. Its name is Pavilion Hall.

Degradation
Like a majority of artificial lakes in the country, Rabindra Sarovar is suffering environmental degradation. Water pollution is on the rise, owing to an increase in tourist flow and habitation around the lake. The Ministry of Environment and Forests, Government of India, has recently included this lake under the National Lake Conservation Plan in the hope that this will help preserve it. The local authorities have also begun an extensive tree plantation program.dumping of garbage in the lake is the main problem of degradation of Rabindra sarobar.

Transport
Rabindra Sarovar is 30 km away from Dum Dum airport and 12 km from the Howrah railway station.

The area is served by the Rabindra Sarobar metro station of the Kolkata Metro and Lake Gardens and the Tollygunge station of the Kolkata suburban railway (Budge Budge section). It is one of the few points where the two railway systems interface (another being Dum Dum and New Garia). The area of Rabindra Sarobar is also well-connected with a bus route. Located in South Kolkata the area is properly connected and is counted as a tourist spot.

Bio-diversity
The lake and the surrounding green cover occupy an area of 192 acres. The water body is of 73 acres while the green cover has an area of 119 acres. It has a unique bio diversity and attracts 107 species of birds, which includes 69 resident birds, 14 local migrants, 23 long distant migrants and one summer visitor. The green cover has 11,000 trees of which 7.500 are over 75 years old. The area also has 13 species of dragonflies.

Gallery

References

a description of Rabindra Sarovar in Rainwaterharvesting
a reference to Rabindra Sarobar in Clickindia.com
a reference to the Pavilion Hall, Rabindra Sarovar in "The Telegraph"

Further reading

Lakes of West Bengal
Neighbourhoods in Kolkata
Parks in Kolkata
Tourist attractions in Kolkata
Memorials to Rabindranath Tagore